Rongotai College is a state single-sex boys' secondary school in the southeastern suburb of Rongotai, Wellington, New Zealand. Serving Years 9 to 13 (ages 12 to 18), the school has 622 students as of July 2015.

About 40 percent of the students are of European heritage, 20 percent identify as Pasifika, and 15 percent are Maori, and there are various Middle Eastern, Asian, and African students.

A highlight for the school is the annual McEvedy Shield athletics event.

Location
The school stands on the Rongotai isthmus which separates Lyall Bay and the Cook Strait to the south from Evans Bay on Wellington Harbour to the north. Having the sea on two sides gives it a particularly bracing microclimate, with gusty winds from the north and, in winter, icy blasts from the south. It is bounded to the east by Wellington Airport, and residential Rongotai to the West. Wellington's city center is a few kilometers to the northwest.

History
Rongotai College was opened in 1928 with Mr. Fritz Martyn Renner as its first headmaster and a teaching staff of seven. It was started as an "overspill" for Wellington College, which was overstretched, and Rongotai became the new school for Wellington boys in the eastern suburbs.

Rongotai College originally accepted enrolments from students of Intermediate School age. However, when Evans Bay Intermediate School opened its doors in 1964, it became purely a secondary school, catering to young men in what are now called years 9 to 13.

The Assembly Hall, known as the Renner Hall, was opened in 1966 and is named after the founding headmaster.

Achievement
The 2013 ERO report was favorable while pointing out areas for improvement, for example in monitoring achievement and attendance levels.

School leadership

Principals

Houses
The four houses at Rongotai College are named after the school's first four headmasters,

 Renner (Red)
 Heron (Blue)
 Lock (Green)
 Mackay (Yellow)

Notable alumni

Dates denote period enrolled as student

The Arts
Andrew Fagan (1976–1979) – writer, singer and songwriter, former frontsman for The Mockers
Tofiga Fepulea'i – actor and comedian, member of the stand up comedy duo Laughing Samoans
Kyle Lockwood (1991–1995) – architectural designer, designer of the Silver fern flag
Ben Lummis (1992–1996) – singer, New Zealand Idol winner
Lani Tupu (1969–1972) – actor
Gordon Walters – artist and designer
Clive Revill (1944–1947) – actor, singer, Two time Tony Award nominee, Golden Globe nominee

Science
 Dr Barry Dent (1973–1977) – CEO of BDG Synthesis, ( organic chemistry)
 Professor Alex Malahoff (1951–1956) – pioneered use of submersibles to explore submarine volcanoes, CEO of GNS Science 2002–2012
 Tony Mahon (1947–52) – built a reputation for his extensive research on geothermal energy; awarded Joseph Aidlin Award
 Dr Campbell Nelson FRSNZ (1957–61) – ex-Professor of Earth Studies at Waikato University, awarded 2004 Hutton medal by the Royal Society

Business
Sam Morgan (1989–1992) – founder of TradeMe

Politics and public service
 Hon. Justice Andrew Becroft (1971–1975) – Principal Youth Court Judge of New Zealand 
David Farrar (1981–1985) – political activist, blogger and pollster
Hon. Justice Richard Heron (dec.) (1948–1954) – former high Court judge
 Professor Stuart McCutcheon (1968–1972) – Vice-Chancellor, the University of Auckland
 Rear Admiral E.C. (Ted) Thorne CB, CBE, Rtd (1935–1938) – Chief of Navy 1972–1975
 Peter Button – OBE, Rescue Helicopter Pilot.

Sport

Basketball
Troy McLean – Wellington Saints and former Tall Blacks basketball player

Cricket
Bruce Edgar (1970–1974) – former New Zealand cricketer
Don Neely – cricket historian, administrator, and former player
Jeetan Patel (1994–1998) – Black Cap (New Zealand cricketer)
Barry Sinclair – former New Zealand Test captain
Ian D S Smith (1970–1973) – sports commentator and former New Zealand cricketer

Football
Billy Harris (1977–1981) – New Zealand football player
Chris Killen (1995–1998) – New Zealand football player
Shane Rufer (1974–1979) – New Zealand football player
Wynton Rufer (1976–1979) – New Zealand football player
Terry Serepisos (1977–1981) – former owner of Wellington Phoenix FC
Michael Utting – New Zealand football player

Hockey
Mitesh Patel (1990–1994) – Black Sticks (New Zealand hockey player)

Rugby League
Sione Faumuina (1994–1997) – rugby league player, Castleford Tigers, formerly New Zealand Warriors and North Queensland Cowboys
 Joseph Tapine (2007–2011) – rugby league player, Canberra Raiders, formerly Newcastle Knights

Rugby Union
Roy Kinikinilau (1993–1998) – rugby union player, Waikato and Chiefs, formerly Hurricanes, Highlanders
Motu Matu'u – Wellington Hurricanes Hooker
Grant Nisbett (1964–1968) – sports broadcaster
Ma'a Nonu – All Black Second Five-Eighth
Mark Reddish – rugby union player, Wellington Lions, Hurricanes, Highlanders
Ardie Savea – All Black, Wellington Lions, Wellington Hurricanes Flanker
Julian Savea – All Black, Wellington Lions, formerly New Zealand Sevens team, IRB International junior player of the year, Wellington Hurricanes winger
Ofisa "Junior" Tonu'u (1999–2000) – All Black halfback
Graham Williams (1956–1963) – All Black flanker
Mick Williment (1953–1957) – All Black fullback

Running
Derek Froude (1973–1977) – represented New Zealand in the men's marathon, at the Olympics in 1984 and 1992
Paul Lloyd (1979–1984) – represented New Zealand in the men's 110m Hurdles, at the Commonwealth Games, Auckland in 1990

Wrestling
Al Hobman dec. – former professional wrestler, trainer and promoter

Yachting
Greg Wilcox (1974–1978) – former New Zealand world champion yachtsman OK Dinghy class

Videoed Canings Controversy

In October 1981, newspapers reported Principal, Noel Mackay, acknowledging that he had videoed the canings of about 25 boys. Mackay explained this as an experiment to see why experienced teachers often 'miss the target' and leave boys with embarrassing marks on their lower buttocks. Statements of support and criticism for Mackay followed. Both the Rongotai Parents' Association and Rongotai Ladies Auxiliary backed the Principal. Some students signed a petition in support of Mackay. The Education Department declined to comment, believing the matter was strictly between the Board and the Principal.

The Campaign Against Violence in Education (CAVE) called a special meeting to consider the Rongotai experiment. A CAVE spokesperson said the Rongotai case confirmed their fears of the sort of abuse they had suspected went on in schools. He added, "I find it rather creepy. The act of beating a young person is nasty in itself - photographing that nastiness is almost obscene."

The Governing Board appears to have been unaware of the filming before August 1981. The Board later asked for the practice to stop and for all videos to be erased. Mr Mackay offered his resignation, but the Board declined and set up a Committee of Inquiry. Mr Mackay stated that his offer of resignation was not linked to the videos.

Following a report from the Committee in November 1981, the Board found that Mr Mackay had acted within his authority while filming the canings and expressed their confidence in him.

Peter Street had complained to the Board after learning his son had been filmed during a caning. Mr Street,  complained that his questions had not been answered by the inquiry and spoke of a whitewash. He asked the Board why there were inconsistencies in the answers given to him earlier by Mr Mackay and the Board chairman concerning the reasons for the experiment.

The Board collected all copies of the inquiry report and destroyed them.

In response to a 2019 allegation made by a former student of sexual impropriety by Mackay, the Rongotai College Board of Trustees stated they were unaware of the complaint until contacted by a reporter. The Chair of the Trustees added that the school and Board '... have strong protocols in place around the reporting and investigation of all forms of abuse...  allegations will be taken seriously, investigated thoroughly and handled with confidentiality.'

Notes
Rongotai College Building Map

External links
 

Secondary schools in the Wellington Region
Boys' schools in New Zealand
Schools in Wellington City
Educational institutions established in 1928
1928 establishments in New Zealand